Joseph Miles (born 17 September 1998) is a Welsh rugby union player, currently playing for Pro14 and European Rugby Champions Cup side Scarlets. His preferred position is flanker.

Professional career
Miles made his professional debut for Cardiff Blues in the 2017–18 Anglo-Welsh Cup in the Round 3 match against Leicester Tigers. He moved to the Scarlets in 2019 and was named in the first-team squad ahead of the 2020–21 season.

References

External links
itsrugby.co.uk Profile

1998 births
Living people
Welsh rugby union players
Cardiff Rugby players
Scarlets players
Rugby union flankers
Rugby union number eights
Rugby union players from Swansea